The Kuwaiti Crown Prince Cup is an end of season cup competition involving teams from the Kuwaiti Premier League and the Kuwaiti Division One league.

The 2009 edition is the 16th to be held.

In previous editions, the competition has been played over two legs but was altered to one leg for this year.

Al Kuwait Kaifan, the current holders of the cup and last years finalists Al Qadsia receive a bye to the Second Round.

First round

12 teams played a knockout tie. 6 clubs advanced to the next round. The games were played between 30 April and 2 May.

Quarter-finals

8 teams play a knockout tie. 4 clubs advance to the next round. Games played between 10 & 11 May.

Semi-finals

4 teams play a knockout tie. 2 clubs advance to the final. Games played on 14 May.

Final

Final played on 1 June

2008
2008–09 domestic association football cups
2008–09 in Kuwaiti football

ar:كأس ولي العهد 2007/2008